Groß-Bieberau is a town in the Darmstadt-Dieburg district, in Hesse, Germany. It is situated 15 km southeast of Darmstadt. It has several sister cities.

References

Darmstadt-Dieburg